The West Virginia Mountaineers are the athletic teams that represent West Virginia University, an American university located in Morgantown, West Virginia. The school is a member of National Collegiate Athletic Association Division I. The Mountaineers have been a member of the Big 12 Conference since 2012. At that time, the Mountaineers joined the Mid-American Conference as an affiliate member for men's soccer. The two major sports at the university are football (played at Milan Puskar Stadium) and basketball (played at the WVU Coliseum), although many of the other sports have large followings as well.

Currently, WVU sponsors seven men's sports, ten women's sports, and one coeducational sport (rifle). Men's golf was the latest sport to be added in the 2015–16 school year.

Championships

NCAA team championships
West Virginia has won 20 NCAA team national championships.

Men's (1)
Boxing (1): 1938 (unofficial)
Co-ed (19)
Rifle (19): 1983, 1984, 1986, 1988, 1989, 1990, 1991, 1992, 1993, 1995, 1996, 1997, 1998, 2009, 2013, 2014, 2015, 2016, 2017
 See also: Big 12 Conference national team titles
 See also: List of NCAA schools with the most NCAA Division I championships

Other national team championships
Below are the national team titles that were not bestowed by the NCAA:

Men's basketball (1): 1942
Rifle (4): 1913, 1961, 1964, 1966
Cricket (3): 2019, 2020, 2022
 See also: List of college athletics championship game outcomes#Rifle
 See also: List of NCAA schools with the most Division I national championships

NCAA individual and relay championships 
West Virginia athletes have won 38 individual and relay national championships:

 Men's (24)
 Boxing - 3
 Indoor track and field - 1
 Rifle -  15 (8 smallbore, 7 air rifle)
 Wrestling - 5
 Women's (14)
 Indoor track and field - 1
 Outdoor track and field - 2
 Rifle - 11 (4 smallbore, 7 air rifle)

Football

Football is the most popular sport at WVU. The West Virginia Mountaineers football team represents West Virginia University in the NCAA Football Bowl Subdivision (FBS) of college football. West Virginia plays its home games at Mountaineer Field at Milan Puskar Stadium on the campus of West Virginia University in Morgantown, West Virginia. The Mountaineers compete in the Big 12 Conference.

With a 712–471–45 record as of the conclusion of the 2013 season, WVU ranks 14th in victories among NCAA FBS programs, as well as the most victories among those programs that never claimed nor won a National Championship. WVU received Division I classification in 1973, becoming a Division I-A program from 1978–2006 and an FBS program from 2006 to the present. The Mountaineers have registered 80 winning seasons in their history, including one unbeaten season (10–0–1 in 1922) and five 11-win seasons (1988, 1993, 2005, 2006, 2007). The Mountaineers have won a total of 15 conference championships, including eight Southern Conference titles and seven Big East Conference titles.

Stadium: Milan Puskar Stadium at Mountaineer Field
Head coach: Neal Brown
Conference: Big 12
All-time record: 701–456–45 (.583)
Bowl record: 14-17
Conference titles: 15 (8 Southern Conference, 7 Big East Conference)
Consensus All-Americans: 11
BCS Bowl Game Record: (3-0)
Highest Coaches Poll ranking: #1 (2007)
Highest AP Poll ranking: #2 (2007)
Highest final top 25 ranking: #5 (1988 & 2005)

Baseball

Playing Facility: Monongalia County Ballpark (2,500 plus hillside seating)
Head Coach: Randy Mazey
Most Victories: 40 (1994)
NCAA Tournament Appearances: 13
Last NCAA Appearance: 2019
All-Americans: 17
Players In The Majors: 26

Men's basketball

Playing Facility: WVU Coliseum (14,000)
Head Coach: Bob Huggins
Most Victories: 31 in 2010
Big East Conference Champion: 2010
NCAA Tournament Appearances: 31
Last NCAA Appearance: 2021
NCAA Final Four: 1959, 2010
NIT Appearances: 15
Last NIT Appearance: 2014
NIT Championships: 2 (1942, 2007)
All-Americans: 13
Drafted Players: 28
Players In The NBA: 14

Women's basketball

Playing Facility: WVU Coliseum (14,000)
Head Coach: Dawn Plitzuweit
Most Victories: 30 in 2014
Big 12 Conference Champion: 2017
NCAA Tournament Appearances: 11
WNIT Appearances: 2
Last NCAA Appearance: 2017
All-Americans: 4
Drafted Players: 3
Players In The WNBA: 2

Cross country
Head Coach: Sean Cleary
World Cross Country Qualifiers: 11
BIG EAST Conference Champions: 2007
NCAA Regional Champions: 2004,2008
NCAA Appearances: 11
NCAA Top 10 finishes: 5: 2007,2008,2009,2011,2014
NCAA Elite 8 finishes:  4: 2008,2009,2011,2014
NCAA Final 4 finishes:  1: 2008
Highest NCAA Finish: 4th
Last NCAA Appearance: 2021
All-Americans: 16
Elite 89 Winners: Ahna Lewis-2009, Kelly Williams 2014
NACAC Campions, Metcalfe, Grandt, Harrison
NACAC Silver Medallists: Asselin, Forsey, Wood
National Team Members: World Cross Country Team Members 10,  NACAC Championships Team Members 10

Men's golf
WVU sponsored men's golf from 1933 until dropping the sport in 1982. On July 1, 2013, then-WVU athletic director Oliver Luck announced that the sport would be reinstated in the 2015–16 school year.

Competition facilities: Seven regional courses (all in West Virginia except as indicated):
 Two courses at Lakeview Golf Resort, Cheat Lake – Lakeview and Mountainview
 Two courses at Nemacolin Woodlands Resort, Farmington, Pennsylvania – The Links and Mystic Rock. In addition, the Mountaineers will use the Nemacolin Golf Academy at the resort as a practice facility.
 Pete Dye Golf Club, Bridgeport
 The Pines Country Club, Morgantown. To be used for both competition and practice.
 Stonewall Jackson Resort, Arnold Palmer Signature Course, Roanoke
Head coach: Sean Covich
The Mountaineer golf program has reached their first ever top 25 ranking back in the fall semester in 2019 with their top 5 finish at the Gopher invitational hosted by the University of Minnesota. In April 2021, they are currently ranked in 76th place according to golf stat.

In 2021, the Mountaineers claimed their third straight Mountaineer Invitational victory on April 13. During that same event, Mark Goetz won the individual tournament with a score of -12 (70-69-65).

2020-2021 roster :

-Jackson Davenport, Freshman

-Mark Goetz, Senior

-Kurtis Grant, Junior

-Olivier Menard, Freshman

-Etienne Papineau, Senior

-Logan Perkins, Senior

-Will Stakel, Freshman

-Trent Tipton, Sophomore

Golf support staff:

Sports administrator : Steve Uryasz

Athletic Trainer: Zach Foster

Associate Athletics director: Bryan Messerly

Strength and conditioning : Nolan Harvath

Director of Business operation: Graham Reger

Student Athlete Dev.: Stephanie White

Gymnastics
Competition Facility: WVU Coliseum (14,000)
Head Coach: Jason Butts
Most Victories: 26 in 1992
NCAA Tournament Appearances: 3 (under former head coach Linda Burdette)
AIAW Appearances: 1
Last NCAA Appearance: 2000 
All-Americans: 4

Rifle
For rifle, a sport in which fewer than 40 NCAA member schools participate, the Mountaineers are a member of the single-sport Great America Rifle Conference and have won the most NCAA Rifle Championships of any school at 19.

Playing Facility: WVU Shell Building
Head Coach: Jon Hammond
Most Victories: 19 in 1964
NCAA Appearances: 26
NCAA Team Championships: 19
NCAA Team Runner up: 7
National Individual Champions: 25
NCAA All-Americans: 65
Olympians: 13
 Gold Medal: Virginia "Ginny" Thrasher - Rio 2016
Awards: CaptainU Coach of the Year

Women's rowing
Playing Facility: WVU Boathouse
Head Coach: Jimmy King

Men's soccer
Playing Facility: Dick Dlesk Soccer Stadium (1,600)
Head Coach: Daniel Stratford
Most Victories: 15 in 2006
NCAA Tournament Appearances: 15
Last NCAA Appearance: 2021
All-Americans: 7
Mountaineer Professionals: 12

Women's soccer

Playing Facility: Dick Dlesk Soccer Stadium (1,600)
Head Coach: Nikki Izzo-Brown
Most Victories: 23 in 2016
BIG EAST Conference Champions: 2007, 2010, 2011
BIG 12 Conference Champions: 2012, 2013, 2014, 2015, 2016, 2022
NCAA Tournament Appearances: 21 (Lost in Finals 2016)
Last NCAA Appearance: 2020
All-Americans: 45
Academic All-American: 4
Mountaineer Professionals: 28

Men's swimming
Playing Facility: Mylan Park
Head Coach: Vic Riggs
Most Victories: 13 in 2007
Big East Conference Champions: 2007
NCAA Qualifiers: 19
NCAA All-Americans: 2
Olympians: 1

Women's swimming
Playing Facility: Mylan Park
Head Coach: Vic Riggs
Most Victories: 9 in 1990
NCAA Qualifiers: 14
NCAA All-Americans: 4
Olympians: 1

Women's tennis
Playing Facility: Mountaineer Tennis Courts
Head Coach: Miha Lisac
Most Victories: 21 in 1990

Women's track
Playing Facility: Mountaineer Track, Shell Indoor Track
Head Coach: Sean Cleary 2007-Present 
 Assistants: Shellyann Galimore Erin Oreilly
Olympians: 7
NCAA National Champions: 3, Pat Itanyi Long Jump 1994, Kate Vermeulen 1999 Mile, Megan Metcalf 5000 2005,
NCAA Runner Up Finishes: Marie Louise Asselin 2011-5000, Kate Harrison 10,000 2012 
NCAA All-Americans: 32
NCAA Top 10 Finishes: 1 2010 Outdoors
NCAA Sweet 16 Finishes: 1999, 2010, 2011
NCAA top 20 Finishes: 1999, 2009 2010,2011,

Women's volleyball
Playing Facility: WVU Coliseum (14,000)
Head Coach: Reed Sunahara
Most Victories: 35 in 1979
NCAA Tournament Appearances: 1
Last NCAA Appearance: 2021
NIT Appearances: 1
All-Americans: 0
All-East: 2

Wrestling
Founded: 1921
Dual Meets and Tournament Facility: WVU Coliseum (14,000)
Head Coach: Tim Flynn
Most Victories: 14 in 1976 and 1990
NCAA Individual Appearances: 67
Best NCAA Finish: 6th in 1991
All-Americans: 16
National Champions: 3
EWL Champions: 18

Prior to joining the Big 12, West Virginia wrestled as a member of the Eastern Wrestling League as the Big East was a non-wrestling conference.

NCAA Division I: NACDA Learfield Director's Cup
See footnote and NACDA Directors' Cup

Notable non-varsity sports

Rugby
The West Virginia Rugby Football Club was established in 1974, and is the oldest established club sport at WVU. In the fall of 2013, WVU won the Keystone Conference and qualified for the American Collegiate Rugby Championship, where they lost to Kutztown in the quarterfinals. In the spring of 2014, WVU reached the D1-AA national playoffs, where they defeated Princeton 41–24, but lost in the quarterfinals 34–14 to San Diego. The Mountaineers play their home games at the Mylan Park Athletic Field Complex. The Mountaineers have been led by Head Coach Glover since spring of 2013.

Cricket
The West Virginia Cricket Club competes in American College Cricket. In 2019, the Mountaineers won the American College Cricket National Championship by defeating NJIT. The following year, the Mountaineers qualified for the 2020 National Championship tournament. However due to COVID-19, the event was canceled. Following the resumption of American College Cricket in 2022, it was decided that the 2020 tournament would be made up. The Mountaineers also qualified for the 2022 National Championship tournament and played in both tournaments during the same week. They went on to win both tournaments, defeating Arkansas State to be crowned 2020 national champions and Florida to become 2022 national champions.

Pageantry

Mascot

The Mountaineer was adopted in 1890 as the official school mascot and unofficially began appearing at sporting events in 1936. A new Mountaineer is selected each year during the final two men's home basketball games, with the formal title "The Mountaineer of West Virginia University." The new Mountaineer receives a scholarship, a tailor-made buckskin suit with coonskin hat, and a period rifle and powder horn for discharging when appropriate and safe. The mascot travels with most sports teams throughout the academic year. While not required, male mascots traditionally grow a beard. Jonathan Kimble, a Franklin, WV native (pictured) served his term as the 2012-2013 WVU Mountaineer. Each newly named Mountaineer will officially take over as the mascot at the annual spring football game.

Logos
Designed by sports artist John Martin, The "Flying WV" is the most widely used logo in West Virginia athletics. It debuted in 1980 as a part of a football uniform redesign by Coach Don Nehlen, and was adopted as the official logo for the university in 1983.
While the "Flying WV" represents all university entities, unique logos are occasionally used for individual departments. Some examples include the script West Virginia logo for the WVU Department of Intercollegiate Athletics, and the interlocking WV logo used in baseball.

Songs
The official fight songs of West Virginia University are "Fight Mountaineers" and "Hail, West Virginia." "Hail, West Virginia." was composed by WVU alumni Earl Miller and Ed McWhorther in 1915 with lyrics by Fred B. Deem. The "Pride of West Virginia" Mountaineer Marching Band performs the second verse of "Hail, West Virginia" as part of its pregame performance at Mountaineer football games. The band's pregame arrangement of "Hail, West Virginia" was arranged by WVU's 7th band director - Dr. Budd Udell. The line "Others may be black or crimson, but for us it's Gold and Blue." is in reference to Washington & Jefferson College, an early rival.

In addition to the official fight songs of West Virginia university, the fan response to West Virginia's official state song, "Take Me Home, Country Roads" by John Denver, has made "Country Roads" the unofficial song of the university (arrangement by Dr. James Miltenberger).

The West Virginia University Alma Mater was composed in 1937, and is sung before every home football game.

Colors
The upperclassmen of 1890 selected the official colors of "old gold and blue" from the West Virginia state seal. While the official school colors are old gold and blue, a brighter gold is used in official university logos and merchandise. This change in color scheme is often cited for the lack of a universal standard for colors during 19th century when the university's colors were selected. Additionally, the brighter gold is argued to create a more intimidating environment for sporting events. The university accepts "gold and blue" for the color scheme, but states clearly that the colors are not "blue and gold", to distinguish West Virginia from its rival school the University of Pittsburgh.

Marching band

The West Virginia University Mountaineer Marching Band is nicknamed "The Pride of West Virginia". The 390-member band performs at every home football game and makes several local and national appearances throughout the year. The band was the recipient of the prestigious Sudler Trophy in 1997.

Sports traditions

Firing of the Musket
The Mountaineer mascot carries a period Musket and powder horn for firing a shot to signal the opening of several athletic events. The Mountaineer points the gun into the air with one arm and fires a blank shot, a signal to the crowd to begin cheering at home football and basketball games. The Mountaineer also fires the musket every time the team scores during football games.

Formation of the State
The Pride of West Virginia forms the outline of the state of West Virginia during the pregame show of all home Mountaineer football games. The outline of the state moves down the field during the playing of "Hail West Virginia", and the shape inverts to face the student side of the stadium when the crowd begins the "Let's Go...Mountaineers" chant.

Cheers
The "Let's Go...Mountaineers" cheer originated at home football games as a competition between opposite sides of the stadium. The student side of the stadium chants "Let's Go...", and the pressbox side responds "Mountaineers". The chant can continue for long periods of time, as each side of the stadium tries to keep the chant from fading. The cheer has spread to other athletic events including basketball and soccer. 

Since the early 2000s, the "WVU First Down" cheer is used when fans are expecting a first down call during a football game. Prior to the announcement, fans put their arms in the air and yell while waiting for the call. After the announcer at Milan Puskar Stadium says, "First down, West Virginia," the fans lower and raise their arms three times while simultaneously yelling the initials "WVU". Then, the fans clap and signal to the end zone while cheering "first down!"

Carpet roll
In 1955, Fred Schaus and Alex Mumford devised the idea of rolling out an elaborate gold and blue carpet for Mountaineer basketball players to use when taking the court for pre-game warm-ups. In addition, Mountaineer players warmed up with a special gold and blue basketball. The tradition died out in the 1960s, died out, but former Mountaineer player Gale Catlett reintroduced the carpet when he returned to Morgantown in 1978 as head coach of the men's basketball team.

Fanbase

In a state that lacks professional sports franchises, the citizens of West Virginia 
passionately support West Virginia University and its athletics teams. West Virginia fans are nationally known for following their Mountaineers to bowl games and games throughout the country. West Virginia games also have received high TV ratings throughout the years. Men's basketball head coach Bob Huggins, a former Mountaineer basketball player who was born in Morgantown, stated that the "strong bond between the university and the people of West Virginia" is a relationship that is difficult for non-natives to understand. Former basketball player Da'Sean Butler cited the fan support as a factor in his decision to play for WVU, saying "everybody loves our school to death" in reference to the fan base in West Virginia.

West Virginia fans have also been recognized for their hospitality. In the first football game played by the University of Connecticut following the death of Jasper Howard, a banner
displayed at Mountaineer Field in the Connecticut entrance tunnel read "Today we are all Huskies". Connecticut fans described the warmth of the environment as impressive, citing the number of WVU fans who offered condolences. In a letter to WVU, then UConn head football coach Randy Edsall wrote:

"The response that you gave our team before and after the game was tremendous and greatly appreciated. The pregame moment of silence and team handshake was the most moving experience I have ever had in my 29 years of coaching football."

Student section

Some WVU fans, primarily in the student sections, have developed a reputation for unruly behavior, being compared to "soccer hooligans" 
by GQ magazine. 
At some events, there have been cases of objects thrown onto the field or at opposing teams.  
There were previously also issues with small-scale fires, most notably of couches, being set after games; over 1,100 intentionally ignited street fires were reported from 1997 to 2003. The tradition of igniting furniture continues to this day, including the celebration after the WVU basketball team won the Big East title. Fires have sometimes occurred in response to non-sporting events, such as following the announcement that Osama bin Laden had been killed.

Notable athletes

Joe Alexander - Former NBA player for the Milwaukee Bucks and Chicago Bulls
Tavon Austin
Stedman Bailey
Terry Bowden - Yahoo Sports Analyst
Tommy Bowden - Former head football coach at Clemson University and Tulane University
Darryl Bryant - International Professional Basketball Player, currently in Tehran, Iran
Kadeisha Buchanan – Current Canada women's international soccer player
Marc Bulger - former NFL quarterback for St. Louis Rams
Da'Sean Butler - Former NBA basketball player for the Miami Heat, currently a Graduate Assistant coach for WVU basketball
Jevon Carter - NBA player for the Milwaukee Bucks
Gale Catlett - Former West Virginia Head coach with the most wins at West Virginia 
Avon Cobourne - Former NFL running back for the Detroit Lions. Currently with the CFL Hamilton Tiger-Cats.
Mike Compton - Former NFL guard for the Detroit Lions, New England Patriots, and Jacksonville Jaguars
Robert Dennis - University's first Male Big East Conference Track & Field champion
Noel Devine - Current CFL running back for the Montreal Alouettes
Devin Ebanks - NBA basketball player for the Los Angeles Lakers
Raymon Gaddis - Current defender for the Philadelphia Union
Mike Gansey - Former professional basketball player in the NBA Development League; currently in the front office of the Cleveland Cavaliers
Major Harris - Quarterbacked for West Virginia in their 1988 undefeated season.
Chris Henry - Former NFL wide receiver for the Cincinnati Bengals
Johannes "Joe" Herber - Former German international basketball player
Jeff Hostetler - Former Washington Redskins, Oakland Raiders & New York Giants Quarterback
Chuck Howley - WVU Five Sport Letterman, former NFL Linebacker and Super Bowl MVP with Dallas Cowboys
Sam Huff - Former NFL Linebacker, was inducted into the Pro Football Hall of Fame in 1982.
Bob Huggins - Former WVU basketball player. Current Head Basketball Coach of the WVU Men's Basketball Team. One of only 4 active Division I coaches with 700+ career victories.
Rodney "Hot Rod" Hundley - First pick in the 1957 NBA draft by the Cincinnati Royals.
Patience Itanyi - West Virginia University’s first-ever female track and field national champion.
James Jett - All-American sprinter and wide receiver for Los Angeles and Oakland Raiders
Adam "Pacman" Jones - Former NFL cornerback for the Tennessee Titans(#6 draft choice overall), Dallas Cowboys and currently with the Cincinnati Bengals
Greg Jones - three-time NCAA Division 1 wrestling champion, 2005 Most Outstanding Wrestler award winner; current Associate Head Coach for the Mountaineer Wrestling team
Kevin Jones - Current power forward for the Cleveland Cavaliers
Brian Jozwiak - Former lineman, Kansas City Chiefs.
Ken Kendrick - owner of the Arizona Diamondbacks of Major League Baseball
Steve Kline - Former Major League Baseball pitcher
Oliver Luck - Former NFL quarterback and president and former athletic director at WVU
Pat McAfee - Former NFL punter for the Indianapolis Colts
Dan Mozes - First Team All American Center, won the Rimington Trophy in his senior year
Adrian Murrell - Former running back for New York Jets
Kevin Pittsnogle - Former WVU basketball star
Jerry Porter - Former NFL Wide Receiver for the Oakland Raiders and Jacksonville Jaguars
Rich Rodriguez - Former head football coach at West Virginia University and University of Michigan
Todd Sauerbrun - Former NFL punter, Went to the Pro Bowl in 2002, 2003, and 2004.
Owen Schmitt - Former NFL fullback for the Oakland Raiders
Floyd B. "Ben" Schwartzwalder - Former head coach of the 1959 National Championship Syracuse University football team
Steve Slaton - Current NFL free agent running back
Geno Smith - Quarterback for the Seattle Seahawks
Darryl Talley - WVU all-time team member and former NFL Linebacker for the Buffalo Bills
Virginia Thrasher, sports shooter who won a gold medal in the women's 10 meter air rifle at the 2016 Summer Olympics
Rod Thorn - Former WVU basketball player and Naismith Memorial Basketball Hall of Fame inductee
John Thornton - Former defensive tackle for the Cincinnati Bengals
Mike Vanderjagt - Former Indianapolis Colts and Dallas Cowboys placekicker
Jerry West - WVU and NBA basketball player, member of Naismith Basketball Hall of Fame, Model for NBA Logo
Pat White - Former NFL quarterback for the Miami Dolphins and Minor League Baseball player for the Kansas City Royals
Andrew Wright - Current Defender/Midfielder for Morecambe F.C.
Amos Zereoué - Former NFL running back for the Pittsburgh Steelers, Oakland Raiders, and New England Patriots

References

External links